Verdalsøra is a town in the municipality of Verdal in Trøndelag county, Norway. The town is the administrative center of the municipality. It is located along the Trondheimsfjord at the mouth of the river Verdalselva. In 1998, the municipal council of Verdal voted to grant the urban area of Verdalsøra town status under the laws of Norway.

European route E6 and the Nordland Line run north and south through the town, with one railway stop in the town: Verdal Station. Aker Verdal has a large shipyard in Verdal.  Verdalsøra Chapel is located in the town.  Verdalsøra is also the location of the local secondary school, Verdal videregående skole and a folk high school.  The Rinnleiret beach area lies just south of the town, on the border with Levanger.

See also
List of towns and cities in Norway

References

Verdal
Cities and towns in Norway
Populated places in Trøndelag